Lasiargus is a genus of dwarf spiders that was first described by C. Chyzer & Władysław Kulczyński in 1894.

Species
 it contains four species, found in Kazakhstan, Kyrgyzstan, Mongolia, and Russia:
Lasiargus hirsutoides Wunderlich, 1995 – Mongolia
Lasiargus hirsutus (Menge, 1869) (type) – Europe, Russia (Europe to Far East), Kyrgyzstan
Lasiargus pilipes (Kulczyński, 1908) – Russia (Middle Siberia to Far East), Kazakhstan
Lasiargus zhui Eskov & Marusik, 1994 – Russia (Far East)

See also
 List of Linyphiidae species (I–P)

References

Araneomorphae genera
Linyphiidae
Spiders of Asia